Tanjungpura University or UNTAN is a public university in the city of Pontianak in West Kalimantan, Indonesia.

Hamzah Haz, former Indonesian vice president, once taught at the university.

History
It was established as the private, government-accredited University of National Power (Universitas Daya Nasional) on 20 May 1959, with Law and Business Administration faculties, and became a public university 16 May 1963. On 20 May 1963, the name was changed to State University of Pontianak (Universitas Negeri Pontianak). On 14 September 1965 the name changed again, to Dwikora University (Universitas Dwikora) (Dwikora, short for Dwi Komando Rakyat, was a reference to the Indonesian 'konfrontasi' with Malaysia). At this time, the Faculty of Social and Political Sciences was opened.

On August 15, 1967, the final name change was effected, to Tanjungpura University, a reference to the Tanjungpura Kingdom that once ruled the area.

Faculties

Law
Economics and Business
Agriculture
Engineering
Social and Political Sciences
Teacher Training and Education
Forestry
Mathematics and Natural Sciences
Medicine

References

Universities in West Kalimantan
Universities in Indonesia
Educational institutions established in 1959
Indonesian state universities
1959 establishments in Indonesia